Valeria Igorevna Belkina (born 6 September 1999) is a Russian female acrobatic gymnast. With partners Victoria Ilicheva and Alena Kholod, Belkina achieved silver in the 2014 Acrobatic Gymnastics World Championships. With partners Zhanna Parkhometets and Yulia Nikitina, they achieved silver in the first European Games from Baku 2015 and achieved gold in the 2016 Acrobatic Gymnastics World Championships.

References

External links

 

1999 births
Living people
Russian acrobatic gymnasts
Female acrobatic gymnasts
European Games medalists in gymnastics
European Games silver medalists for Russia
Gymnasts at the 2015 European Games
Medalists at the Acrobatic Gymnastics World Championships
21st-century Russian women